Ralph Nading Hill (September 19, 1917 – December 10, 1987) was a Vermont writer and preservationist.

Hill's books include The Winooski, Heartway of Vermont (1949), which viewed Vermont through the lens of the river known to the Algonquians as "The Onion River"  and Sidewheeler Saga, a book about the steamboat Ticonderoga, the last sidewheel steamer on Lake Champlain. Hill worked on the boat, which traveled between Vermont and New York across Lake Champlain, for three years.

Hill later became well known in Vermont for preserving the Ticonderoga, at first trying to keep the boat running as an excursion steamer, and then persuading Electra Havemeyer Webb to buy the ship for her Shelburne Museum .  The ship was transported overland to the museum in 1955.

Bibliography
Lake Champlain, Key to Liberty
The Doctors Who Conquered Yellow Fever
Yankee Kingdom: Vermont and New Hampshire, 1960
Contrary Country: A Chronicle of Vermont
Vermont; A Special World
Vermont Album: A Collection of Early Vermont Photographs
The Winooski: Heartway of Vermont
The Voyages of Brian Seaworthy
Robert Fulton and the Steamboat
Lake Champlain Ferryboats: A Short History of Lake Champlain and the Story of Over 200 Years of Lake Champlain Ferryboats

References 

1917 births
1987 deaths
Dartmouth College alumni
Writers from Vermont
20th-century American historians
American male non-fiction writers
20th-century American male writers